John Joseph Hyland Jr  (September 1, 1912 – October 15, 1998) was an admiral in the United States Navy who commanded the U.S. Pacific Fleet from 1967–1970.  A naval aviator, he was a champion of the aircraft carrier.

Biography
Hyland was born in 1912 in Philadelphia, the son of a naval officer. He graduated from the U.S. Naval Academy in 1934 and completed naval aviation training in 1937. Posted to the Philippines, he was located there when the Japanese attacked Pearl Harbor to begin US involvement in World War II. He participated in the defense of the Philippines, and the subsequent Allied withdrawal to Australia, winning the Distinguished Flying Cross for rescuing a British airman in the Molucca Sea. He then became the personal pilot of Admiral Ernest King, then Chief of Naval Operations. He participated in numerous operations, earning a Silver Star for leading a ground attack against the Japanese at Kure on March 19, 1945, and another Distinguished Flying Cross and the Air Medal for other missions against the Japanese.

 After the war, he served stints as a test pilot, then took command of the carrier  in 1958. He later commanded Carrier Division Four, then moved to a staff position at the Strategic Plans Division in Washington DC. In 1965, President Lyndon Johnson selected him ahead of 72 more senior rear admirals for promotion and command of the US Seventh Fleet, then operating off Vietnam and heavily involved in US operations there. Hyland commanded the fleet for nearly two years before being promoted again and taking command of the entire Pacific Fleet in 1967, a four star billet.

Admiral Hyland retired on January 1, 1971. In retirement, he maintained an interest in naval aviation, served in business directorships, and settled in Honolulu.  He was married to the former Florence Day Whiting, who died in 1991; they had four children: sons John J. Hyland III and Whiting Walker Hyland and daughters Nancy Arnold and Pamela Hyland.

Awards
A non-exhaustive list of military awards is as follows: 

Admiral Hyland was also granted the John Paul Jones Award for leadership by the Navy League in 1966.

References

External links
Citations for Admiral Hyland's awards from the Military Times

1912 births
1998 deaths
United States Naval Academy alumni
United States Naval Aviators
United States Navy admirals
Recipients of the Air Medal
Recipients of the Silver Star
Recipients of the Navy Distinguished Service Medal
Recipients of the Distinguished Flying Cross (United States)
Burials in the National Memorial Cemetery of the Pacific